Nervebreakers are a Dallas-area punk rock band that formed in 1973. Well known for their melodic, rocking punk with a liberal smattering of George Jones and psychedelia, they have the distinction of being one of the few bands to open for The Sex Pistols.

Background
Nervebreakers started as a cover band playing songs from the sixties. As the Ramones and the Sex Pistols became big in America, the band was finally able to find a sustaining audience. Nervebreakers first big break came when they opened for the Ramones on July 24, 1977 at The Electric Ballroom, a dance hall in the industrial district of Dallas. In 1978 Nervebreakers opened for the Sex Pistols at The Longhorn Ballroom, and a photo of guitarist Barry Kooda appeared the March 1978 issue of Rolling Stone Magazine. Later that year the band recorded their debut EP "Politics" - the song "My Girlfriend is A Rock" became a runaway hit in San Francisco, Sacramento, and Boston and was later covered by the Angry Samoans and Wool, among others. They also opened for The Clash, John Cale, The Police and Johnny Thunders.

Nervebreakers contacted legendary Psychedelic rock pioneer and Texas native, Roky Erickson and wound up doing double duty by opening several shows as Nervebreakers, as well as being Roky's backing band.  A live recording of one of these shows was released on CD by the French record company New Rose Records.

In 1979 they recorded a single for Wild Child Records containing the songs "Hijack the Radio" and "Why Am I So Flipped", and contributed 2 songs ("So Sorry" (Barry Kooda) and "I Love Your Neurosis") to the ESR Compilation "Are We Too Late For The Trend?" They recorded another song I Don't Believe In Anything but it was not released. By 1980, Nervebreakers were one of the biggest bands in Dallas. They began recording their debut album We Want Everything on May 27, but the album was not released until 1994 when Texas rarities / reissue label Existential Vacuum released a vinyl LP, to rave reviews. Shortly thereafter, this effort was picked up by garage / punk label Get Hip Records, and the CD was made available worldwide. In 2000 Italian label Rave Up Records released Hijack the Radio, a vinyl LP collection of singles, rarities and live cuts. 
 
After the departure of Mike and Bob in 1981, Paul Quigg and James Flory joined, and the band won the "Agora's Battle of the Bands" in Dallas. The prize was recording time at Pantego Studios, where they recorded a Thom Edwards/Mike Haskins  original "Girls, Girls, Girls, Girls, Girls", along with an obscure Rolling Stones cover, "I'd Much Rather Be With The Boys". The single was released on black and blue vinyl in a clear sleeve, but by then the band had already parted company.

In 2014, the song "I Love Your Neurosis" was played briefly during the opening sequence of the fourth episode in the first season of the AMC show "Halt and Catch Fire", which takes place in the nineteen eighties.

Reforming
Mike, Tex, Barry, Carl and Bob re-entered the studio in 2007-2008 to record new original material entitled “Face Up to Reality”, which was slated for release in 2011. In 2009, Nervebreakers returned to live performance, with several shows in Austin and Dallas.

Band members
 Thom "Tex" Edwards: Vocals
 Mike Haskins: Lead Guitar/Vocals
 Barry  "Kooda" Huebner:  Rhythm Guitar/ Vocals
 Carl Giesecke: Drums
 Pierre Thompson: Bass was replaced by Clarke Blacker and later "BBQ" Bob Childress
 Paul Quigg (Guitar) and James Flory (Bass) replaced Mike and Bob for the East Coast tour and the 45 single *"Girls.../...Boys" 
 Walter Brock: played Farfisa and was instrumental in writing some of the band's most notable, early songs prior to the name change from Mr. Nervous Breakdown to Nervebreakers when Walter left and Barry joined.
 Tom Ordon: sometime manager and proprietor of Wild Child Records that released the three singles.

References

External links
 Nervebreakers Official Website
 Nervebreakers on Facebook
 T. Tex Edwards
 Barry Kooda
 New Rose Records
 Dallas Observer

Punk rock groups from Texas
Musical groups from Dallas
Musical groups established in 1975